Clay Roberts is the head coach of the Florida Tropics SC indoor soccer team based in Lakeland, Florida as well as the Southeastern University Fire. Roberts has also served as Director of Soccer at VSI Tampa Bay FC, and director of coaching at Brandon FC.

As a player, Roberts attended Florida Southern College. Professionally, he played for the Charlotte Eagles and the Philadelphia KiXX, where he was a part of their 2007 MISL championship.

As a coach and administrator, Roberts has been the vice president of the Ocala Stampede in the PDL, the director of VSI, director of Brandon FC, both women's and men's head coach at Philadelphia Biblical University (now Cairn University), the Buxmont Torch FC of the WPSL, and an assistant at Palm Beach Atlantic University.

In his first year at Southeastern University, Roberts was named the Sun Conference 2015 soccer coach of the year as the team won the school's first-ever conference championship.

Roberts again won the Sun Conference Coach of the Year award in 2019. Just months later, Roberts was also honored as Coach of the Year for the Major Arena Soccer League, having led the Florida Tropics to their first winning record and an Eastern Conference Championship with an 18-3 record.

Clay's brother, Cheyne, is also a coach, most recently with the USL Championship's Tampa Bay Rowdies.

References

Major Indoor Soccer League (2001–2008) players
Major Indoor Soccer League (2008–2014) players
Charlotte Eagles players
Philadelphia KiXX players
Cairn University
Southeastern Fire men's soccer coaches
Florida Southern Moccasins men's soccer players
Living people
Roberts
Roberts
Roberts
Sportspeople from Hillsborough County, Florida
Soccer players from Florida
Association football defenders
American soccer players
Florida Tropics SC
Major Arena Soccer League coaches
Year of birth missing (living people)
American soccer coaches